Joseph Bearwalker Wilson (1942–2004) was a shaman and witch, founder of the 1734 Tradition of witchcraft, the Toteg Tribe, Metista, and a founding member of the Covenant of the Goddess.

Wilson was born December 11, 1942 and raised just inside the city limits of St. Johns in Clinton County, Michigan. He grew up with some Christian influence, but developed an early interest in the occult and in fully utilizing the powers of the mind, which he felt were barely tapped. During his early adult life he studied comparative religion, or more specifically, encouraged his teaching: "what they all have in common must be close to the truth." He died August 4, 2004 from complications of chronic obstructive pulmonary disease.

Air Force career and spirituality
Wilson joined the Air Force in September 1961, and in autumn 1962 he met another airman called Sean who introduced him to ritual practices designed to bring mental focus. Sean's wife also taught Wilson the use of roots and herbs to perform magic spells. Sean coached in a type of spiritual awareness which Joe felt was similar to, but not the same as, witchcraft. Sean also recommended readings to him, of which the most influential were The White Goddess by Robert Graves, The Magic Arts in Celtic Britain by Lewis Spence, and The Golden Bough by Sir James George Frazer, however Wilson found Sean's practical teachings more valuable than these written works.

In 1964 Wilson started a four-page newsletter he called The Waxing Moon which was "a journal of the old religion" or "a witchcraft newsletter". In 1965 an advertisement for Pentagram in The Waxing Moon put him in contact with Roy Bowers, alias "Robert Cochrane", with whom he studied by mail until Bowers' death in 1966. Copies of their letters can be found online. Wilson founded the "1734 Tradition" late 1973 and 1974 when he compiled the Flags, Flax and Fodder booklet. He also participated in the formation of the Covenant of the Goddess, eventually leaving following their insistence that he adopt the Wiccan Rede.

OSI agent

In 1971 Wilson was a staff sergeant stationed at Lakenheath, England, who became a "secret agent" for the Air Force Office of Special Investigations, spying upon his fellow servicemen who were working from within the military to protest American involvement in the Vietnam War.  Wilson's testimony against Air Force Captain Thomas Culver led to the latter's court martial; subsequently, writers in the Neo-Pagan and Wicca communities of the time branded Wilson as a "warlock" or traitor to paganism.

As Wilson describes it, he spent most of 1971 and 1972 in a "blur" caused by alcoholism. After his testimony against captain Culver, he received "hate mail" from the pagan community, "literally hundreds of letters from people throughout the United States and England. [...] 95% of those letters condemned me. [...] People [...] wrote to tell me what a traitor I was and how much they hated me. Some of the letters threatened my life and the
lives of my family. [...] I think this is when I started serious drinking. Tim Zell of the Church of All Worlds and Green Egg wrote something like, 'Joe, how could you. This is terrible. You could have gone down in history as an important founder of the pagan movement. Now you are nothing but a traitor.'"

Toteg Tribe
The bulk of Joseph's work in his later life had to do with his shamanic walk, which produced first Metista, a spiritual system for non-native people which introduced the concept of interaction with the spirits of ancestry and land which belonged, not to an indigenous tribe, but to the actual familial stream and current geographical location of the practitioner. Metista developed into Toteg Tribe, which is a fully enabled spiritual system consisting of interaction with Mother Earth, Father Sky, the genus loci of a person's geographical location, one's own familial ancestors, and ancestors of culture, heritage, and artistic and intellectual teachers. He also became a student of Catherine Yronwode, studying African American hoodoo folk magic, and recommending this tradition to his own students in the Toteg Tribe.  The Toteg Tribe website may be found at Toteg Tribe The entire text of Joseph's book, "Nature Religion..." is contained on the page, and the book itself is in the process of reprint and will again be available through Amazon in early summer of 2010.

His more recent work, "So You Wanna Be A Shaman, Eh?" which was in the process of being edited at the time of his death in 2004, is expected to be released late in 2010 or early in 2011.

References

External links
 1734 Witchcraft: The Authentic Method of Robert Cochrane and Joseph Bearwalker Wilson
 Toteg Tribe

American occultists
Neoshamanism
1942 births
2004 deaths
People from St. Johns, Michigan
United States Air Force Office of Special Investigations
American Wiccans
Founders of new religious movements